Durgerdam is a village in the Dutch province of North Holland. It is a part of the municipality of Amsterdam, and lies about 7 km east of the city centre, along the dyke of the IJmeer.

Durgerdam is a part of the deelgemeente (sub-municipality) Amsterdam-Noord. The village has about 430 inhabitants.

Durgerdam was a separate municipality between 1 May 1817, and 1 January 1818, when it was merged with Ransdorp.

Durgerdam hosted the second "Pit Stop" on The Amazing Race 12, a reality television show that circles the globe.

References

Populated places in North Holland
Former municipalities of North Holland
Amsterdam-Noord
Geography of Amsterdam